Potamos is a Greek town adjacent to the city of Corfu. Potamos was established as a settlement on 28 January 1866 by publication of the decision in the Greek government gazette. On 15 December 1915, it became part of the City of Corfu. In 2019, it was removed from the administrative unit of the municipality of Corfu, and transferred to the municipality of Central Corfu and Diapontia Islands. In 2011, the population of Potamos was 3840.

References 

Populated places in Corfu (regional unit)